Hirschberg an der Bergstraße is a town in the Rhein-Neckar district of Baden-Württemberg, Germany. Hirschberg is situated on the Bergstraße ("Mountain Road") on the western rim of the Odenwald. It lies between Weinheim to the north and Schriesheim to the south. Hirschberg consists of two boroughs:
Leutershausen
Großsachsen

References

Rhein-Neckar-Kreis